Orienteering at the World Games is organized as an individual competition for both women and men, and a mix relay for teams of two men and two women.

The International Orienteering Federation (IOF) became a member of the International World Games Association (IWGA) in 1995. The World Games are held every four years, for sports that are not contested in the Olympic Games. Orienteering was first included in the program in 2001.

Venues

Sprint

Men

Women

Individual/Middle

Men

Women

Relay

Mixed

References

 
Sports at the World Games
World Games